Temporary restoration is a temporary filling of a prepared tooth until permanent restoration is carried out. It is used to cover the prepared part of the tooth, in order to maintain the occlusal space and the contact points, and insulation of the pulpal tissues and maintenance of the periodontal relationship. Sometimes permanent restoration is not done after tooth preparation; this may be to prepare for indirect restoration such as inlays and onlays.
Temporary fillings are also used for 'stabilization' techniques where many restorations are needed, and the problem may become worse before it can be fully treated – so temporary fillings are placed in order to stop progression.

Materials used
Zinc oxide eugenol
Intermediate Restorative Materials
Zinc Phosphate Cement

References
 The White Smiles

Dentistry procedures